There are no major league sports franchises in the American state of Montana due to the state's relatively small and dispersed population, but a number of minor-league teams play in the state.

Baseball is the minor-league sport with the longest heritage in the state, and Montana is home to four Minor League baseball teams, all members of the Pioneer Baseball League.  Many athletes move out of Montana to pursue their professional career in other states.

Football and basketball are the two most popular sports at the high school level. Montana is one of the few states where the smallest high schools participate in six-man football leagues. Numerous other sports are played at the club and amateur level, including softball, rugby, and soccer.

A number of Montanans have become notable for their involvement in a wide range of sport. Dave McNally is a baseball player who was a starting pitcher for the Baltimore Orioles for 13 years. Phil Jackson is a basketball player and head coach who has been voted one of the Top 10 Coaches in National Basketball Association History. Flint Rasmussen is a rodeo clown who won the Professional Rodeo Cowboys Association "Clown of the Year" award for eight consecutive years. Football players and coaches from Montana include Dave Dickenson, Pat Donovan, Jerry Kramer, and Jan Stenerud. Dickenson played quarterback in both the Canadian Football League (CFL) and National Football League (NFL) before becoming a head coach in the CFL for the Calgary Stampeders and BC Lions. Pat Donovan was ranked the top football player and number five overall athlete from Montana in the 20th century. Donovan played left tackle for the Dallas Cowboys, was a four-time Pro Bowler, and played in three Super Bowls, winning one. Jerry Kramer played offensive guard for the Green Bay Packers, was a three-time Pro Bowler, and a five-time All-Pro. He is ranked the number one player not in the Pro Football Hall of Fame by many Hall of Fame voters. Jan Stenerud is a Norwegian who went to college in Montana on a ski jumping scholarship. He was a placekicker in the American Football League (AFL) and NFL for 19 years, mostly for the Kansas City Chiefs. He was the first soccer-style kicker in the NFL and was elected to the Pro Football Hall of Fame in 1991.

In 1904, a group of young Native-American women from Montana, after playing undefeated during their last season, went to the Louisiana Purchase Exposition held in St. Louis, Missouri, and defeated all challenging teams and were declared to be world champions. For this they received a large silver trophy with the inscription "World's Fair – St. Louis, 1904 – Basket Ball – Won by Fort Shaw Team".

Baseball

Basketball

Boxing

Gridiron football

Rodeo

Wrestling

Other athletes

See also

 List of people from Montana
 Lists of sportspeople

References

External links
 e-Referencedesk list of famous Montanans

Montana
Lists of people from Montana
 
Montana sports-related lists